Parliamentary elections were held in Hungary between 29 April and 8 May 1906. The parties of the allied opposition received 87.96% of the vote. The main party of the opposition, the Party for Independence and '48, received an absolute majority alone (61.26%). However the party failed to govern effectively as cleavages in the party led to several splits and due to the compromise made with Franz Joseph I of Austria.

Results

Parliamentary
Hungary
Elections in Hungary
Elections in Austria-Hungary
Hungary
Hungary

hu:Magyarországi országgyűlési választások a dualizmus korában#1906